Mark-Anthony Kaye (born December 2, 1994) is a Canadian professional soccer player who plays as a midfielder for Major League Soccer club Toronto FC and the Canada national team.

Early life
Kaye was born in Toronto, Ontario, Canada and first began playing soccer with Wexford SC in Scarborough. He later played with Ajax SC, winning a provincial title in 2009, and Glen Shields SC and Bryst FA. He attended Elementary school at John Ross Robinson Public School and High School at Lawrence Park Collegiate Institute where he would play soccer, where he was twice named team MVP, as well as participating in cross country, and track and field.

University career
Kaye played two years of university soccer at York University between 2012 and 2013.  During his university career he played in 29 matches and scored 18 goals.  He was named OUA rookie of the year after his first year season and selected to the CIS all-Canadian second-team and the OUA first-team as a second year. York would win the OUA championship during his final season.

Club career

Early career 

Kaye left York and joined TFC Academy, the academy side of Major League Soccer's Toronto FC in 2013. In 2014, he played in League1 Ontario with the senior academy team appearing in nine matches and scoring one goal. Kaye joined the Wilmington Hammerheads of the USL Pro on loan from TFC Academy in August 2014 as part of an affiliation between the two clubs. He made his professional debut on August 23, 2014, in a league match against Orange County Blues FC. The next day, Kaye tallied his first professional goal and assist as Wilmington drew 3–3 with LA Galaxy II. In total, Kaye appeared in 7 matches and tallied 2 goals and 2 assists during his loan with the Hammerheads.

Toronto FC II

2015 season

On March 12, 2015, Kaye and seven other players were signed by USL side Toronto FC II ahead of their inaugural season.  He made his debut against the Charleston Battery on March 21 and would appear in 22 matches without a goal.

Louisville City

2016 season

On January 13, 2016, Kaye would sign with USL side Louisville City FC and he would make his season debut in the opening match on March 26 against Charlotte.  He would go on to play in 24 of Louisville's 28 regular season matches scoring one goal with three assists. He also played in two of Louisville's three USL Cup matches going goalless. He did, however, score in the penalty shootout in the Eastern Conference Finals match against New York Red Bulls II. A match New York would go on to win.

2017 season

Kaye would miss the first two matches of the 2017 season while on international duty and would make his season debut on April 8 against Richmond.  He would on to play in 19 of Louisville's 32 regular season matches scoring four goals.  He also played in both of Louisville's U.S. Open Cup matches; scoring once against the Tartan Devils.  In the USL Cup playoffs Kaye would start all four matches as he and Louisville would go on to win the USL Cup Final against Swope Park.

Los Angeles FC
After two seasons in Louisville, Kaye would be transferred to MLS side Los Angeles FC for their inaugural season. He would make his LAFC debut against the Seattle Sounders during the 2018 season opener. On July 26, 2018, Kaye suffered a fractured foot in the El Tráfico rivalry game against the LA Galaxy, with coach Bob Bradley saying he'd need surgery, with LAFC setting no timetable for his return; NBC Sports reported that the injury would sideline the player for "4–6 months".

Colorado Rapids
On July 27, 2021, Kaye was traded, alongside a first-round pick in the 2022 MLS SuperDraft to the Colorado Rapids in exchange for $1 million in General Allocation Money and a 2022 international roster slot. He made his debut for the Rapids on August 7 against Sporting Kansas City. On August 21 Kaye scored his first goal for the Rapids, netting the game-winner in a 2–1 comeback win over Rocky Mountain Cup rivals Real Salt Lake. At the end of the season Colorado announced they had exercised Kaye's contract option, keeping him at the club through the 2022 season. Before the start of the 2022 season Colorado would announce Kaye would sign a 4 year contract extension, through the end of the 2025 season, with an option for 2026.

Toronto FC
In July 2022, Toronto FC announced they had traded Ralph Priso, General Allocation Money, a first round pick in the 2023 MLS SuperDraft and an international roster slot for Kaye. The move returned Kaye to Toronto after six years away and also reunited him with his coach at LAFC, Bob Bradley. He made his debut on July 13, starting against the Chicago Fire and going 63 minutes in a 2-0 defeat. Kaye scored his first goal for Toronto FC in their first match of the 2023 season, netting Toronto's second goal in an eventual 3-2 defeat to D.C. United on February 25, 2023.

International career

Youth
In May 2016, Kaye was called to Canada's U23 national team for a pair of friendlies against Guyana and Grenada. He saw action in both matches. In March 2017 Kaye was called up again to the U23 side for the Aspire Tournament which also featured the hosts Qatar and Uzbekistan.

Senior
Kaye made his debut for the senior team against Curaçao in a friendly on June 13, 2017. On June 27, he was named to Canada's squad for the 2017 CONCACAF Gold Cup. He was named to the squad for the 2019 CONCACAF Gold Cup on May 20, 2019. Kaye scored his first goals for Canada on March 29, 2021, netting a brace in a 11–0 victory over the Cayman Islands. In July 2021 Kaye would join Canada for his third Gold Cup tournament, being named to the squad for the 2021 edition of the competition.

In November 2022, Kaye was called-up to Canada's squad for the 2022 FIFA World Cup.

Style of play
During his time at Louisville, Kaye played as an "attacking midfielder and winger", however following his ascension into MLS, he assumed a "box-to-box central midfield role, one that he's thriving in"; he also performed this role on international duty with Canada. LAFC coach Bob Bradley said of Kaye: "He brings a little bit more range, a little bit more ability to get around the ball, a little bit of an ability to close down, win some balls in air, get into the box in both sides. All those things make him a little bit different". During his time with Toronto FC II, Kaye was frequently used at left back.

Career statistics

Club

International

Scores and results list Canada's goal tally first, score column indicates score after each Kaye goal.

Honours
Toronto FC III
 League1 Ontario League Champions: 2014
 L1O/PLSQ Inter-Provincial Cup Champions: 2014

Louisville City
 USL Cup: 2017

Los Angeles FC
 Supporters' Shield: 2019
Individual
 MLS All-Star: 2019

References

External links
 
 

League 1 Ontario profile
York Lions profile

1994 births
Living people
Canadian soccer players
Canadian expatriate soccer players
York Lions soccer players
Toronto FC players
Wilmington Hammerheads FC players
Toronto FC II players
Louisville City FC players
Los Angeles FC players
Colorado Rapids players
Soccer players from Toronto
Expatriate soccer players in the United States
League1 Ontario players
USL Championship players
Major League Soccer players
Black Canadian soccer players
Canada men's under-23 international soccer players
Canada men's international soccer players
2017 CONCACAF Gold Cup players
2019 CONCACAF Gold Cup players
2021 CONCACAF Gold Cup players
Association football midfielders
2022 FIFA World Cup players
Canadian sportspeople of Jamaican descent